Bryan Illerbrun (April 20, 1957 - May 16, 2013) was a professional Canadian football offensive lineman who played fourteen seasons in the Canadian Football League for three teams. He was a part of the BC Lions' Grey Cup victory in 1985 and the Saskatchewan Roughriders' Grey Cup victory in 1989.

References

1957 births
2013 deaths
Canadian football offensive linemen
Saskatchewan Roughriders players
BC Lions players
Ottawa Rough Riders players
Players of Canadian football from Saskatchewan